= Project PRISMation =

Japanese animation channel

- Network: YouTube

Programming
- Language: Japanese

Ownership
- Owner: Abema

History
- Launched: 27 December 2025; 10 months ago

Links
- Website: project-prismation.com

Availability

Streaming media
- YouTube: Project PRISMation

Project PRISMation is a Japanese animation channel owned by Abema, it launched in 2025.

== History ==
It was announced the Poppin Play Kitchen is officially greenlight. In addition, PRISMation announced the opening worldwide pilots.

== Programming ==
Title	Creator(s)	First released	Last released	Ref.
Poppin Play Kitchen	Zemyata	16 January 2026	TBA	
Gluttomy	Rapitus	23 January 2026	TBA	
The Horrors' Horror Home	Uguisu Kobo	30 January 2026	TBA	
The Chatty Jewel and the Phantom Thieves	Miou Hiruma	December 2026	TBA	
Salon de Monde	Yu Sato	December 2026	TBA	
Lanpmoss Coffee	Fantasy Restaurant Kani	December 2026	TBA	
